The 2018–19 Slovak Cup was the 50th edition of the competition. This tournament began on 15 July 2018.

Slovan Bratislava were the defending champions having won the previous season's Cup by defeating MFK Ružomberok in the final by a score of 3–1.

Format
The Cup this season was a knockout tournament contested between 236 clubs. Matches which were level after regulation advanced to penalties to determine a winner. Each round of the cup was contested over one leg with the exception of the semi-finals which were contested over two legs.

Second round
Sixty-four matches in the second round were played from 7 August 2018 to 6 September 2018.

|}

Third round
Thirty-two matches in the third round were played from 29 August 2018 to 26 September 2018.

|}

Fourth round
Sixteen matches in the fourth round were played from 2 October 2018 to 23 October 2018.

|}

Round of 16
Eight matches in the sixth round were played from 23 October 2018 to 16 November 2018.

|}

Quarter-finals
Four matches in the quarter-finals were played on 12–13 March 2019.

|}

Semi-finals
For the semi-finals, the first legs were played on 2 and 3 April and the second legs on 16 and 17 April 2019.

First leg

Second leg

Final

See also
 2018–19 Slovak First Football League

Notes

References

External links 
 soccerway.com

Slovak Cup seasons
Cup
Slovak Cup